Sweet Temptation  is a 2015 omnibus web series starring all six T-ara members (Hahm Eun-Jung, Park Ji-yeon, Park Hyo-min, Jeon Bo-ram, Park So-yeon and Lee Qri) Jung Chaeyeon and Cho Seung-hee. The show was a joint venture between South Korea and China. It was one of the first original projects produced by Naver TV Cast.

The drama accumulated over 800,000 views in less than a month on Naver TV, making it one of the streaming service's most watched original shows.

Synopsis 
Sweet Temptation is a fantasy romance drama that unfolds through a mobile phone application that grants the wishes of six people.

Cast

Main 

 Park So-yeon as So Hee
 Lee Qri as Qri
 Hahm Eun Jung as Eun-jin
 Park Ji-yeon as Ji-ho
 Jeon Bo-ram as Bo-ram
 Hyo Min as Hyo-jin
 Lee Joong Moon as Hyun Joon
 Jang Soo Won as Kim Su Won
 Kim Jae Wook as Seok Min
 Seo Joon Young as Sang Min
 Kim Shi Hoo as Chae Soo
 Hyun Woo as Han Woo

Supporting 

 Cho Seung-hee as witch
 Jung Chae Yeon as Ah-mi
 Kim Min Hyung as Dong Woo
 Lee So Yul as So Jin

Guests 

 Keon Hee (Ep.1)
 Yang Hak Jin as Eun-jin's boyfriend (Ep.5)
 Kim Jong Min as Manager

Episodes

Background & production 
Sweet Temptation is a joint venture between South Korea and China. It was co-produced by Naver TV, MBK Entertainment and SBS The show and was scheduled to air in both countries. 6 posters were released to promote the show, one for each T-ara member and her co-star.

In August 2015, when T-ara was preparing for their comeback, Brave Brothers' "So Crazy" and Shinsadong Tiger's "1,2,3" competed for the title song, but "So Crazy" received more votes, while "1,2, 3" was used as the opening and closing theme of the drama. However, the song was never officially released on any platform. Due to high complaints, T-ara members spoke about the issue and revealed that they thought the song was already released. In 2021, during their 10th anniversary Live on VLive, Eun-jung revealed that she would think about releasing the song in the future.

On August 13, the drama premiered at Megabox COEX in Samseong-dong, Gangnam-gu, Seoul, South Korea and was attended by the cast and staff.

Soundtrack

Reception

Commercial performance 
The drama was a commercial success garnering over 800,000 views in less than a month on Naver TV, making it one of the streaming service's most watched original shows.

"Goodbye" by Eun-jung, the third original soundtrack, was a hit, mainly in China topping the weekly YinYueTai chart with a record-breaking score of 94.23; the highest recorded score for any Korean soundtrack on the platform. The song also peaked at number 3 on Billboard China, a first for a Korean soundtrack. It was also included in the list of "Best songs to listen to in October 2015" by TV Report.

"Fall on the chest", by MC the Max's Lee Soo debuted at 2 on Mnet weekly chart and at 7 on Soribada weekly chart.

Critical reception 
The drama received generally favorable reviews due to its original plot and the main cast's acting, notably Park Jiyeon who was praised for her tearful performance in her 2 episodes "Reborn" and her chemistry with her fellow actor Seo Jun Young.

External links 

Sweet Temptation at Naver TV (in Korean)

References 

2015 web series debuts
2015 web series endings
South Korean web series
T-ara
Naver TV original programming